FCGS may refer to:
 Al-Fateh Center for Gifted Students, now the Libya Center for Gifted Students, in Benghazi, Libya
 Fulham Cross Girls School, in London

See also 
 FCG (disambiguation)